The bay-crowned brushfinch (Atlapetes seebohmi) is a species of bird in the family Passerellidae.

It is found in the Andes in Ecuador and Peru. Its natural habitats are subtropical or tropical dry forest and subtropical or tropical moist montane forest.
It is very similar to the white-winged brushfinch, but does not have white on the wings. The face of the bay-crowned brushfinch is also blacker than the white-winged brushfinch.
As with most brushfinches, they are commonly found in pairs that quickly move from tree to tree.

References

bay-crowned brush finch
Birds of the Ecuadorian Andes
Birds of the Peruvian Andes
bay-crowned brush finch
bay-crowned brush finch
Taxonomy articles created by Polbot